Sergey Kostyuk (born 30 November 1978) is a retired Kazakhstani football midfielder.

Club statistics
Last update: 28 October 2012

References

External links

 
 

1978 births
Living people
Footballers from Odesa
Ukrainian footballers
Ukrainian expatriate footballers
Expatriate footballers in Kazakhstan
Ukrainian expatriate sportspeople in Kazakhstan
Kazakhstani footballers
Kazakhstan international footballers
Association football forwards
Ukrainian emigrants to Kazakhstan
FC SKA-Lotto Odesa players
SC Odesa players
FC Chornomorets Odesa players
FC Chornomorets-2 Odesa players
FC Vorskla Poltava players
FC Vorskla-2 Poltava players
FC Polissya Zhytomyr players
FC Dnister Ovidiopol players
FC Atyrau players
FC Shakhter Karagandy players
FC Vostok players
FC Zhetysu players
FC Tobol players
FC Spartak Semey players
FC Real Pharma Odesa players
Ukrainian Premier League players
Ukrainian First League players
Ukrainian Second League players
Kazakhstan Premier League players